Reflections by Idries Shah is a collection of eighty fables, aphorisms, and statements that seek to challenge the conditioned mind. The book intends to confront the reader with unaccustomed perspectives and ideas, in an attempt to set the mind free, to see how things really are.  As the book’s foreword states, "Do you imagine that fables exist only to amuse or to instruct, and are based upon fiction? The best ones are delineations of what happens in real life, in the community and in the individual’s mental processes".

Content 
Reflections is a collection of a foreword and eighty brief literary pieces which were designed for reflection. Many are as brief as this example:

Reception
This small, pocket-sized book was well received by critics. In her review in The Observer, author Doris Lessing called Reflections "... a lively collection of fables, comments, aphorisms, its quality astringency." The New York Times Book Review called it "... witty, tart and instructional - they tend to come into your mind at appropriate moments." Pat Williams, reviewing for BBC's Review of the Year, stated that Reflections was "Very funny ... more wisdom than I have found in any other book this year. I found myself sitting up straight."

References

External links
The Idries Shah Foundation
Free Online Read and Audiobook

1968 books
Sufi literature
Books by Idries Shah
Contemporary philosophical literature